Larré is a commune in the Morbihan department of Brittany in north-western France.

Geography
The river Arz forms all of the commune's northern border.

Demographics
Inhabitants of Larré are called in French Larréens.

See also
Communes of the Morbihan department

References

External links

 Mayors of Morbihan Association 

Communes of Morbihan